John Anthony Brooks Jr. (born January 28, 1993) is a professional soccer player who plays as a defender for Bundesliga club 1899 Hoffenheim. Born in Germany, he represents the United States national team.

Born in Berlin, Germany, he began his career at hometown club Hertha BSC, making his professional debut in 2012 and totaling 130 games and nine goals for the club. The team won the 2. Bundesliga in 2012–13. In 2017, he transferred to VfL Wolfsburg for €20 million, a record at the time for an American player.

Brooks represented both Germany and the United States at youth international level, qualifying for the latter through his father. He made his senior international debut in 2013 and represented the nation at three tournaments, including the 2014 FIFA World Cup.

Early life
Brooks is the son of an American serviceman from Chicago, Illinois, and was born and raised in Berlin, Germany. He has a map of Illinois tattooed on his left elbow and one of Berlin on his right. He has never lived in the United States.

Club career

Hertha BSC
Brooks came through the ranks of his hometown club, Hertha BSC. He reached Hertha's reserve team halfway through the 2010–11 season, although he still had a year and a half of remaining eligibility for the U-19 team. Brooks signed a four-year professional contract with Hertha after the season, turning down interest from Bayern Munich. Brooks spent nearly all of the 2011–12 season with Hertha II, taking a brief foray back to the U-19 team. Brooks continued to grow during this time, reaching 6'4".

Hertha suffered relegation from the Bundesliga in 2012. After the departure of some players and his form in preseason, Brooks made his professional debut as a starter in Hertha's 2. Bundesliga opener on August 3, 2012, a 2–2 draw with SC Paderborn 07 at the Olympiastadion. He played 29 matches over the season as the team won the league title and promotion, and scored once in the last game of the season on May 19, 2013, a late equalizer in a 1–1 home draw with Energie Cottbus.

Brooks scored in his Bundesliga debut on August 10, 2013, in Hertha BSC's 6–1 victory against Eintracht Frankfurt. His appearances over the season were limited by injury and poor form, and he also missed time in April 2014 while recovering from the application of a large back tattoo, a decision that did not please manager Jos Luhukay.

On December 17, 2014, Brooks opened the scoring for Hertha in a 4–4 draw with Eintracht Frankfurt that saw Berlin throw away a two-goal lead in the final minute. During the 2014–15 Bundesliga season, Brooks won 68% of his direct duels in a total of 27 league appearances for the club, ranking third best among Bundesliga players making at least 17 appearances. Brooks also had a pass accuracy of 75% while finishing top 12 in the Bundesliga in clearances per match.

In the 2015–16 season, Brooks played four matches in Hertha's run to the semi-finals of the DFB-Pokal. On December 15, he headed the second goal of a 2–0 win at 1. FC Nürnberg in the last 16 of the tournament.

VfL Wolfsburg
On May 31, 2017, Brooks signed with fellow Bundesliga club VfL Wolfsburg. The reported €20 million transfer fee was a record for an American soccer player at the time, later broken by Christian Pulisic's €64 million transfer to Chelsea in 2019. He made his debut on August 13 in the first round of the DFB-Pokal away to fourth-tier Eintracht Norderstedt, but suffered a torn thigh tendon and was substituted in the first half of the 1–0 win, being ruled out for the next three months. On October 28, he returned to the team to start on his league debut for the club, a 1–1 draw at Schalke 04. Affected by injury all through his first season at the Volkswagen Arena, Brooks totaled just ten appearances before playing the full 180 minutes of the 4–1 playoff win over Holstein Kiel that kept his team in the Bundesliga for the following season.

On March 2, 2022, it was confirmed that Brooks would leave Wolfsburg at the end of the season.

Benfica
On September 1, 2022, Brooks signed a one-year contract with Primeira Liga side Benfica on a free transfer. He made his Primeira Liga debut on September 18, replacing António Silva in the 89th minute in the 5–0 home win over Marítimo.

1899 Hoffenheim
On 26 January 2023, Brooks returned to the Bundesliga, signing a two-year contract with 1899 Hoffenheim, for a reported fee of €500,000.

International career

Brooks, who holds both German and American citizenship, participated in several camps for both the U.S. U-20 and U-23 team and in one for the Germany U20 team. He made his international debut for the U.S. Under-20 team in a 5–0 loss against Paraguay in September 2010.

In July 2013, German magazine kicker indicated that Brooks had received a call-up from the U.S. senior  national team to feature in a friendly against Bosnia and Herzegovina. Brooks made his senior international debut in the 4–3 victory over Bosnia.
Brooks was named in the United States's final 23-man roster for the 2014 FIFA World Cup. In the opening group match against Ghana, he came on as a halftime injury substitute for Matt Besler and scored the winning goal in the 2–1 victory, a header off Graham Zusi's corner kick. He became the first American to score as a substitute at the World Cup.

On June 5, 2015, Brooks scored in a friendly against the Netherlands in Amsterdam as the United States fought back from a 1–3 deficit to win 4–3, their first victory against the Dutch. Later that month, he was named in coach Jürgen Klinsmann's squad for the 2015 CONCACAF Gold Cup, playing four matches as the team finished fourth.

Klinsmann also called Brooks up for the Copa América Centenario, the centenary edition of the Copa América held in the United States in 2016. He played all five matches as the nation lost 4–0 to Argentina in the semi-finals, but did not take part in the bronze medal match loss to Colombia.

Career statistics

Club

International

Scores and results list United States' goal tally first, score column indicates score after each Brooks goal.

Honors
Hertha BSC
2. Bundesliga: 2013–14

United States
CONCACAF Nations League: 2019–20

Individual
IFFHS CONCACAF Team of the Decade: 2011–2020
CONCACAF Nations League Finals Best XI: 2021

References

External links

U.S. Soccer bio

1993 births
Living people
German people of American descent
German people of African-American descent
Sportspeople of American descent
Citizens of the United States through descent
African-American soccer players
Footballers from Berlin
German footballers
American soccer players
Association football defenders
Hertha BSC II players
Hertha BSC players
VfL Wolfsburg players
S.L. Benfica footballers
TSG 1899 Hoffenheim players
Bundesliga players
2. Bundesliga players
Primeira Liga players
Germany youth international footballers
United States men's under-20 international soccer players
United States men's under-23 international soccer players
United States men's international soccer players
2014 FIFA World Cup players
2015 CONCACAF Gold Cup players
Copa América Centenario players
21st-century African-American sportspeople